The finswimming events at the 2009 World Games in Kaohsiung was played between 23 and 24 July. 79 athletes from 14 nations participated in this discipline. The competition took place in Kaohsiung Swimming Pool.

Participating nations

Medal table

Events

Men

Women

References

External links
 World Underwater Federation
 Finswimming on IWGA website
 Results

 
 

 
2009 World Games
2009